The Politics of Huaihua in Hunan province in the People's Republic of China is structured in a dual party-government system like all other governing institutions in mainland China.

The Mayor of Huaihua is the highest-ranking official in the People's Government of Huaihua or Huaihua Municipal Government. However, in the city's dual party-government governing system, the Mayor has less power than the Communist Party of Huaihua Municipal Committee Secretary, colloquially termed the "CPC Party Chief of Huaihua" or "Communist Party Secretary of Huaihua".

History
In March 2016, Li Yilong was investigated by the Communist Party of China's anti-graft agency.

List of mayors of Huaihua

List of CPC Party secretaries of Huaihua

References

Huaihua
Huaihua